Biodosimetry is a measurement of biological response as a surrogate for radiation dose.  The International Commission on Radiation Units and Measurements and International Atomic Energy Agency have issued guidance on performing biodosimetry and interpreting data.

Notes and references

Radiation health effects
Medical signs